Attorney General Gilbert may refer to:

Frank L. Gilbert (1864–1930), Attorney General of Wisconsin
Joseph Trounsell Gilbert (1888–1975), Attorney General of Bermuda

See also
General Gilbert (disambiguation)